Alexis Pelat (1902-1962) was a French politician. He served as a member of the National Assembly from 1956 to 1958, representing Bouches-du-Rhône.

Early life
Alexis Pelat was born on 31 December 1902 in Marseille, France. His father was a pastry chef. He did his military service in Saarbrücken and served in the French Army during World War II.

Career
Pelat worked as a pastry chef in Marseille.

Pelat joined the Union for the Defense of Tradesmen and Artisans. He served as a member of the National Assembly from 1956 to 1958, representing Bouches-du-Rhône. He was a proponent of French Algeria.

Personal life and death
Pelat married Louise-Marie Delvat, and they had two children. He died on 14 January 1962 in Marseille, France.

References

1902 births
1962 deaths
Politicians from Marseille
Union for the Defense of Tradesmen and Artisans politicians
Deputies of the 3rd National Assembly of the French Fourth Republic
French military personnel of World War II